Pogonocherus cedri is a species of beetle in the family Cerambycidae. It was described by Peyerimhoff in 1916. It is known from Algeria. It feeds on Cedrus atlantica and Abies numidica.

References

Pogonocherini
Beetles described in 1916